The Eastern Pacific black ghostshark (Hydrolagus melanophasma, literally a combination of "water rabbit" and "black ghost") is a species of fish in the family Chimaeridae. Despite its name, it does not belong to the clade Selachii used for the modern classification of sharks. It is, however, distantly related to the sharks in the sense that both are Chondrichthyes (cartilaginous fishes).

References

External links
Greg Laden: The Eastern Pacific Black Ghost Shark on smithsonian.com, 2009-9-28 (contains a short video of the fish)
Christine Dell'Amore: Weird New Ghostshark Found; Male Has Sex Organ on Head. National Geographic News, 2009-9-22
http://www.fishbase.se/summary/Hydrolagus-melanophasma.html

Eastern Pacific black ghostshark
Western American coastal fauna
Eastern Pacific black ghostshark